Steven Holl (born December 9, 1947) is a New York-based American architect and watercolorist.

His work includes the 2022 Rubenstein Commons at the Institute for Advanced Study; the 2020 Campus expansion of the Museum of Fine Arts Houston including the Nancy and Rich Kinder Building and Glassell School of Art; the 2019 REACH expansion of the John F. Kennedy Center for the Performing Arts; the 2019 Hunters Point Library in Queens, New York; the 2007 Bloch Building addition to the Nelson-Atkins Museum of Art in Kansas City, Missouri; and the 2009 Linked Hybrid mixed-use complex in Beijing, China.

Career

Family and education
Holl was born on December 9, 1947, and grew up in Bremerton and Manchester, Washington. Holl received a Bachelor of Arts from the University of Washington (department of architecture) in 1971.

Recognition and awards
In 1998, Holl was awarded the prestigious Alvar Aalto Medal. In 2000, Holl was elected to the American Academy of Arts and Letters. In July 2001, Time named Holl America's Best Architect, for "buildings that satisfy the spirit as well as the eye." Other awards and distinctions include the best architectural design in New York for The Pace Collection showroom in 1986 from the American Institute of Architects, the New York American Institute of Architects Medal of Honor (1997), the French Grande Médaille d’Or (2001), the Smithsonian Institution’s Cooper-Hewitt National Design Award in Architecture (2002), Honorary Fellow of the Royal Institute of British Architects (2003), the Arnold W. Brunner Prize in Architecture from the American Academy of Arts and Letters, and the 2008 BBVA Foundation Frontiers of Knowledge Award in the Arts category.  In 2007, Steven Holl Architects received the AIA Institute Honor Award and the AIA New York Chapter Architecture Merit Award for Art Building West for the School of Art and Art History (University of Iowa, Iowa City). The Higgins Hall Insertion at Pratt Institute (Brooklyn, New York) and the New Residence at the Swiss Embassy both received the AIA New York Chapter Architecture Honor Award in 2007. In 2010, Herning Museum of Contemporary Art, (Herning, Denmark) was awarded the RIBA International Award. The Horizontal Skyscraper-Vanke Center received the 2011 AIA Institute National Honor Award, as well as the AIA NY Honor Award. In 2011, he was named a Senior Fellow of the Design Futures Council., and Holl was named the 2012 AIA Gold Medal winner. In 2014, Holl was awarded the Praemium Imperiale Prize for Architecture. In 2016, Holl was awarded The Daylight and Building Component Award by the VELUX Foundation.

Teaching
Holl is a tenured professor at Columbia University, where he has taught since 1981 with Dimitra Tsachrelia. He frequently teaches on the relationship between music and architecture.

'T' Space 
In 2010, Holl founded 'T' Space, a multidisciplinary arts organization in Rhinebeck, New York. The core aim of 'T' Space is to create educational fusions of art, architecture, music, and poetry of the 21st century. The organization operates a summer exhibition series and an emerging architects summer residency in pursuit of their mission.

The 'T' Space Synthesis of the Arts Series explores the intersection of hi, architecture, and ecology through 2 to 3 exhibitions of work by emerging and established artists and architects. As of its 2019 season, 'T' Space has exhibited architects José Oubrerie, Tatiana Bilbao, and Neil Denari, as well as artists such as Ai Weiwei, Pat Steir, and Brice Marden.

In 2017, 'T' Space began offering a summertime residency program for young architects and artists. Program participants design purpose-built architecture for rural communities, with curriculum emphasizing the ecological outcomes of design. During project development, the residents participate in pin-ups, field trips, and a public lecture series, from architects including Christian Wassmann, Christoph Kumpusch, Tamas Nagy, and Holl himself.

In addition to its arts and educational programming, 'T' Space maintains a publication program and a 30-acre nature reserve with outdoor installations of art and architecture. In 2019, construction was completed on 'T' Space's architectural archive and research library, which will come to house Holl's work as a watercolorist, as well as models, drawings and other architectural materials developed in Holl's 40-plus years as principal of Steven Holl Architects.

Works

Early works

Holl won first prize in the Amerika-Gedenkbibliothek International Library Design Competition in 1988, an expansion and renovation of the American Memorial Library in Berlin. In February, 1989 Holl's work was exhibited in a solo show at the Museum of Modern Art (MoMA) in New York City.  MoMA later purchased twenty-five works by Holl for the museum's permanent collection. In the 1992 competition for a new contemporary arts museum in Helsinki, Finland, Holl's entry, entitled "Chiasma," won first prize out of more than five hundred international entries.  The museum opened to the public in 1998, having permanently adopted the name "Kiasma," the Finnish transliteration of "chiasma."

In designing the Chapel of St. Ignatius (built 1994-1997), Jesuit chapel at Seattle University, Holl addressed the campus's need for green space by siting the chapel in the center of a former street and elongating the building plan. New green campus quadrangles were formed to the north, west, and south, and a future quadrangle is planned to the east. In 1997, the plan of the chapel won a design award in the American Institute of Architects of New York. Holl designed the Chapel around St. Ignatius's vision of the inner spiritual life, "seven bottles of light in a stone box", by creating seven volumes of different light. Each volume represents a different part of Jesuit Catholic worship, and has differently colored glass so that various parts of the building are marked out by colored light. Light sources are tinted both in this way and by indirect reflection from painted surfaces, and each is paired with its complementary color. In 2022, the American Institute of Architects bestowed the Chapel of St. Ignatius, Seattle, WA, with the prestigious Twenty-five Year Award.

Significant works

Y house New York, Catskill 1997-1999

Competition selections 
 Project for the Extension of the Ameika Gedenkbibliothek, Berlin, Germany (1988)
 Kiasma Museum of Contemporary Art, Helsinki, Finland (1992; completed 1998)
 Zollikerberg Housing, Zollikerberg, Switzerland (1993)
 Dusseldorf Urban Arms, Dusseldorf, Germany (1993)
 I-Project, Seoul, Korea (1996)
 Bloch Building expansion, The Nelson-Atkins Museum of Art, Kansas City, Missouri (1999; completed 2007)
 Millstein Hall, School of Architecture Cornell, Ithaca, New York  (2001)
 Toolenburg-Zuid Living in the 21st Century, Schipol, The Netherlands (2001)
 Residence for the Swiss Ambassador, Washington, D.C. (2001; completed 2006)
 Los Angeles County Museum of Natural History, Los Angeles, California (2002)
 Sail Hybrid casino development, Knokke-Heist, Belgium (2005)
 Cité de l'Océan et du Surf, in collaboration with Solange Fabiao, Biarritz, France (2005; completed 2010)
 Herning Museum of Contemporary Art, Herning, Denmark (2005; completed 2009)
 Denver Justice Center, Denver, Colorado (2005)
 Meander Housing, Taivallahti Residential Area, Helsinki, Finland (2006; in construction)
 Horizontal Skyscraper - Vanke Center, Shenzhen, China (2006; completed 2009)
 Ningbo Fine Grain, Ningbo, China (2008)
 L&M Harbor Gateway, Copenhagen, Denmark (2008)
 Seona Reid Building, Glasgow School of Art, Glasgow, Scotland (2009; completed 2014)
 Visual Arts Building, University of Iowa, Iowa City, Iowa (2010; completed 2016)
 Hangzhou Oxygen, Hangzhou, China (2010)
 Hangzhou Music Museum, Hangzhou, China (2010)
 Virginia Commonwealth University's Institute for Contemporary Art, Richmond, Virginia (2011; completed 2018)
 Campus Expansion, Museum of Fine Arts Houston (MFAH), Houston, Texas (2011; completed 2020)
 The REACH, John F. Kennedy Center for the Performing Arts, Washington, D.C. (2012; completed 2019)
 Tianjin Eco City Ecology and Planning Museums, Tianjin, China (2012)
 Qingdao Culture and Art Center, Qingdao, China (2013)
 Mumbai Art Museum, North Wing, Mumbai, India (2014) 
 Arts College Masterplan, Williams College, Williamstown, Massachusetts (2015) 
 Rubenstein Commons, Institute for Advanced Study (IAS), Princeton, New Jersey (2016; completed 2022) 
 Angers Collectors Museum and Hotel, Angers, France (2017) 
 Médecins Sans Frontières Geneva Headquarters, Geneva, Switzerland (2017-2018) 
 Tushino Residential Towers, Moscow, Russia (2017-2018) 
 University College Dublin, Future Campus Competition, Dublin, Ireland (2018; in construction) 
 Ostrava Concert Hall, Ostrava, Czech Republic (2019; in construction)
 Hansae Factory Office and Showroom, Seoul, Korea (2019)
 Terezín Ghetto Museum Competition, Terezín, Czech Republic (2022)

Selected publications
Along with Pallasmaa and Alberto Perez-Gomez, Holl wrote essays for a 1994 special issue of the Japanese architectural journal A+U under the title "Questions of Perception: Phenomenology of Architecture." The publication was reissued as a book in 2006.
Pamphlet Architecture 5: Alphabetical City, Princeton Architectural Press, New York, 1980.
Pamphlet Architecture 9: Rural and Urban House Types, Princeton Architectural Press, New York, 1983.
Anchoring, Princeton Architectural Press, New York, 1989.
 Steven Holl: Educating our Perception, in “Magic Materials II”, Daidalos, August 1995.
Intertwining, Princeton Architectural Press, New York, 1996.
Pamphlet Architecture 13: Edge of a City, Princeton Architectural Press, New York, 1996.
Pamphlet Architecture 1-10, Princeton Architectural Press, New York, 1998.
The Chapel of St. Ignatius, Princeton Architectural Press, New York, 1999.
Parallax, Princeton Architectural Press, New York, 2000
 Steven Holl: Architecture Spoken, Rizzoli, 2007
House - Black Swan Theory, Princeton Architectural Press, 2007
Urbanisms: Working with Doubt, Princeton Architectural Press, 2009
Pamphlet Architecture 11-20, Princeton Architectural Press, New York, 2011.
Pamphlet Architecture 31: New Haiti Villages, Princeton Architectural Press, New York, 2011.
 Steven Holl: Horizontal Skyscraper, William Stout Publishers, 2011
 Steven Holl: Scale, Lars Müller Publishers, 2012
 Steven Holl: Color, Light and Time, with essays by Sanford Kwinter and Jordi Safont-Tria, Lars Müller Publishers, 2012
Urban Hopes: Made in China by Steven Holl, edited by Christoph Kumpusch, Lars Müller Publishers, 2013
Steven Holl, Robert McCarter, Phaidon, New York, 2015
Steven Holl Seven Houses, Rizzoli, New York, 2018
Compression, Princeton Architectural Press, New York, 2019.
The REACH: The John F. Kennedy Center for the Performing Arts, text by Barry Bergdoll, photographs by Richard Barnes, Rizzoli, New York, 2019.
Steven Holl: Inspiration and Process in Architecture, Princeton Architectural Press, New York, 2020.

Notes

References
Fred Rush, On Architecture, Routledge, London and New York, 2007.
Scott Drake, “The Chiasm and the experience of space”, JAE, Nov. 2005, vol.59, iss. 2, 53–59.
Alberto Perez-Gomez, Juhani Pallasmaa, Steven Holl, Questions of Perception. Phenomenology of Architecture, William K. Stout Pub., San Francisco, 2006 (2nd edition).
Alberto Perez-Gomez, “The architecture of Steven Holl: In search of a poetry of specifics”, El Croquis 93, 1999.
Philip Jodidio, Architecture Now!, Icons, Taschen, New York, 2002.
Gareth Griffiths, "Steven Holl and His Critics", Ptah, Helsinki, 2006.
Nancy Marmer, "Holl's Kiasma Debuts in Helsinki," Art in America, October 1998, p. 35.

External links 

 Steven Holl Architects website
 The Stretto House by Steven Holl (with drawings)
 The Chapel of St. Ignatius
 Photographs of Architect Steven Holl Designed Modern Home in Dallas, Texas
 Photos of the Nelson Atkins Museum Bloch Building
 The Kennedy Center Expansion Project

 
1947 births
Living people
20th-century American architects
Postmodern architects
Members of the American Academy of Arts and Letters
University of Washington alumni
Columbia University faculty
Columbia Graduate School of Architecture, Planning and Preservation faculty
People from Bremerton, Washington
Alumni of the Architectural Association School of Architecture
New York City
21st-century American architects
Architects from Washington (state)
Recipients of the AIA Gold Medal